Tobel is a village and former municipality in the canton of Thurgau, Switzerland.

In 1999 the municipality was merged with the neighboring municipality Tägerschen to form a new and larger municipality Tobel-Tägerschen.

Former municipalities of Thurgau
Villages in Switzerland